The 2015–16 season was Plymouth Argyle's fifth consecutive season in League Two and their 130th year in existence. Along with competing in League Two, the club participated in the FA Cup, League Cup and Football League Trophy. The season covers the period from 1 July 2015 to 30 June 2016.

Current squad

Last updated: 6 March 2016Source:Greens on Screen

Pre-season

League Two

League table

Results by round

Matches

On 17 June 2015, the fixtures for the forthcoming season were announced.

Football League play-offs

League Cup

Matches

FA Cup

Matches

Football League Trophy

Matches

Appearance / Goals / Disciplinary 

Last updated: 22 May 2016Source:Greens on Screen

Transfers

Transfers in

Transfers out

Loans in

Loans Out

References

Plymouth Argyle
Plymouth Argyle F.C. seasons